Cupedia cupediella is a moth of the family Gracillariidae. It is found from Sardinia to Bulgaria and Greece.

The larvae feed on Pistacia terebinthus. They mine the leaves of their host plant. The mine starts as an epidermal, sometimes branched, lower-surface corridor, later a lower-surface tentiform mine, which is almost invariably at the leaf margin, with folded epidermis. The mine is eaten out until only the veins remain. Pupation takes place outside of the mine in a small dirty white, transparent cocoon.

References

Gracillariinae
Moths of Europe
Moths described in 1855